Menisciopsis penangiana is a fern species in the genus Menisciopsis. It has many synonyms, including Abacopteris penangiana and Pronephrium penangianum.

Flavan-4-ols glycosides, abacopterins A, B, C and D together with triphyllin A and 6,8-dimethyl-7-hydroxy-4‘-methoxyanthocyanidin-5-O-β-d-glucopyranoside, can be isolated from a methanol extract of the rhizomes of M. penangiana.

References

External links

 
 

Thelypteridaceae